Chapda is a town in the Dewas district of Madhya Pradesh state in India.

Demographics
The Chapada village has a population of 6624. In 2011, the literacy rate of Chapada village was 73.20% compared to 69.32% in Madhya Pradesh. In Chapada, Male literacy stands at 83.04% while the female literacy rate was 62.79%.

See also
 Dewas district
 Bagli, Dewas

References

External links
 Postal code details of Chapda

Cities in Malwa
Cities and towns in Dewas district